David Marrero and Fernando Verdasco were the defending champions, but withdrew from the semifinals against Alexander Peya and Bruno Soares.
Mariusz Fyrstenberg and Marcin Matkowski won the title, defeating Peya and Soares in the final, 3–6, 6–1, [10–8].

Seeds

Draw

Draw

References
 Main Draw

International German Open - Doubles
2013 International German Open